WWF The Music, Volume 3 is a soundtrack album by WWE (then known as the World Wrestling Federation, or WWF). Released on December 29, 1998 by Koch Records, it features entrance theme music of various WWF superstars, all of which were composed and performed by Jim Johnston (with the exception of one song, performed by Insane Clown Posse). The album was a commercial success, charting at number ten on the US Billboard 200.

Composition
All songs on WWF The Music, Volume 3 were credited as being written, composed and performed by WWE composer Jim Johnston, with the exception of the entrance theme for The Oddities, which was credited to hip hop duo Insane Clown Posse And also Sable theme was released in 1996 for Marc Mero & Sable as a remix . Music website AllMusic categorised the album as heavy metal.

Reception

Commercial
WWF The Music, Volume 3 was a commercial success. In the US, the album reached number ten on the US Billboard 200; in Canada, it reached number eight on the Canadian Albums Chart. It was certified platinum by the Recording Industry Association of America, indicating sales of over a million units. The album also reached number 97 on the UK Albums Chart. WWF The Music, Volume 3 was the first WWE album to sell a million copies, spent 30 weeks on the Billboard 200 and had sold a total of 1.21 million copies as of April 2002.

Critical
Music website AllMusic awarded the album one and a half out of five stars. Writer Becky Byrkit described it as "a truly marginal collectable," sarcastically declaring that "this record is to real music what the [WWE] is to real sports."

Track listing

Charts

Certifications

See also

Music in professional wrestling

References

The Music, Volume 3
WWF The Music, Volume 3
WWF The Music, Volume 3
WWF The Music, Volume 3